Align may refer to:

 Align (album), an album released by the band Halifax 
 The process of alignment (disambiguation)
 Align Technology, a medical device company
 align and align*, environments that use the amsmath package used for arranging equations of multiple lines in LaTeX
 For controlling alignment in Wikipedia articles see :Category:Positioning templates